In Spanish politics during the late 19th and early 20th centuries, El Turno Pacífico ("The Peaceful Turn") was an informal system operated by the two major parties for determining in advance the result of a general election. The system ensured that the Conservative Party and the Liberal Party would have alternating periods in power.

Operation
Under the turno, the incoming government would first be chosen by the king and would then "make" the election (the so-called encasillado or "pigeonholing"), ensuring victory. After a period in office, it would then be the turn of the opposition. The key to the system was the link between the minister of the interior, the provincial civil governors, and the local bosses (caciques). These caciques in most constituencies would instruct their clients how to vote.  A similar system in Portugal was called .

Motivation
The Turno Pacífico was put in place by Antonio Cánovas del Castillo and saw to it that the two "official" parties of the Cánovas Restoration, the Partido Conservador (or Liberal-Conservatives) and Partido Liberal (or the Liberals), retained power in alternation. Both parties upheld the monarchy and could be seen as factions of the "governing class". 

After almost a century of political instability and many civil wars, the Restoration of 1874 sought to achieve political stability in Spain. Under the turno, no sector of the bourgeoisie felt isolated and patronage could be doubled. It worked effectively until 1898, surviving the death of Alfonso XII in 1885, but then became more difficult to operate because of divisions within the major parties and the growing mobilization of sectors of the electorate.

Cessation
Despite being modelled on the United Kingdom, Spanish democracy lacked a responsiveness to popular opinion as (until about 1914) the outcome of elections was broadly decided in advance. Growing opposition was first apparent after Spain's defeat in the Spanish–American War. A period of grave instability occurred in 1918 and 1919, but between 1920 and 1923, a serious attempt was made to reconstruct the turno. It was brought to an end by the military coup by General Miguel Primo de Rivera in September 1923.

Election results under the turno

References

Political history of Spain
Elections in Spain
Electoral fraud